Dhobi Ghat Ground, officially known as Iqbal Park, is a public park situated in the center of Faisalabad, near the main bus station at Narwala Road and Bhawana Bazaar.

History
Dhobi Ghat was renamed as  'Iqbal Park', Faisalabad later but the name Dhobi Ghat is still very much in use among the common people in this city. The Government of Punjab, Pakistan website still uses both names – Dhobi Gat or Iqbal Park for this location.

Quaide-e-Azam Muhammad Ali Jinnah was invited to address a very large gathering of an estimated 2 million people here at Dhobi Ghat grounds as part of a campaign for Pakistan Movement in 1943. Dhobi Ghat Grounds, Faisalabad are known to have historical significance due to many other Pakistani political leaders, following Jinnah's tradition, later chose to use it for political gatherings.

References

Tourist attractions in Faisalabad
Memorials to Muhammad Iqbal